Protestantism is a small minority faith in overwhelmingly Muslim Saudi Arabia. 
The number of adherents of Protestantism is estimated at above 100,000, even though many of them are unaffiliated. 
Public practice of Christian religion is prohibited. However, there are cases in which a Muslim will adopt the Protestant Christian faith, secretly declaring his/her faith. In effect, they are practising Protestants, but legally Muslims. A 2015 study estimates some 60,000 believers in Christ from a Muslim background. Most of these subscribe to some form of evangelical or charismatic Christianity.

See also 
Christianity in Saudi Arabia
Roman Catholicism in Saudi Arabia

References 

 
Christianity in Saudi Arabia